Wild Ocean is the debut album by John Hughes, released in October 2004. The album features many well known Irish musicians, such as The Chieftains and The Corrs. It also launched the solo career of Tara Blaise, who co-wrote and provided vocals for two songs on the album.

The album was rereleased in 2009.

Track listing 
 "Deo"
 "Dancing in the Wind"
 "The Opus Tree"
 "Horizon"
 "Beannacht Leat"
 "Casa Torres"
 "Come Away"
 "Prelude"
 "Lament"
 "The Phoenix"
 "Dreamtime"
 "Slipstream" (Japan only bonus track)

All tracks written by John Hughes, except tracks 2 and 7, written by John Hughes and Tara Blaise.

Credits 
 Tara Blaise − Lead Vocals, Backing Vocals
 Kevin Conneff − Bodhran
 Andrea Corr − Backing Vocals, Tin whistle
 Caroline Corr − Backing Vocals, Drums, Bodhran
 Jim Corr − Backing Vocals, Guitar, Piano
 Sharon Corr − Backing Vocals, Violin
 John Dexter Ensemble − Choir
 Anthony Drennan − Guitar
 Keith Duffy – Bass guitar
 Billy Farrell − Programming, Keyboards
 Finbar Furey − Uilleann pipes
 Brian Furlong − Tin Whistle, Low whistle
 John Hughes − Additional guitar
 Sean Keane − Violin
 Matt Molloy − Flute
 Paddy Moloney − Uilleann pipes, Tin whistle
 Fiachra Trench − Orchestra arranged and conducted by,
 Caitriona Walsh − Orchestra Manager

External links 
 Wild Ocean - Official Site

2004 debut albums
John Hughes (Irish musician) albums